The New Venture Gear 4500, commonly called NV4500, is a 5-speed manual transmission manufactured by New Venture Gear and used in General Motors and Chrysler products from 1991 to 2007.

The NV4500 is a very popular 5-speed manual conversion and upgrade transmission in light trucks and SUVs including Toyota, Ford, Jeep, General Motors, and Dodge. Commercially produced adapters are available to mate this transmission with many different engines and transfer cases.

There were many subtle changes during the production of this transmission, but the main two variations were:
NV4500LD: Used in GM gas and diesel applications, and Dodge V8 gas applications.
NV4500HD: Used in Dodge light duty trucks with the Cummins Turbo Diesel and the V10 Magnum gas engine.

Shared specifications
Dry weight:	195 lbs.
Oil capacity:	1 gallon
Max. GVW:	14,500 lbs.
Case material:	Cast Iron
Synchronizers:	Carbon fiber composite
Reverse Gears:  Un-synchronized until 1996
Main/Counter shaft bearings:	Timken tapered roller

Lubrication
Special Synthetic gear oil is required for proper operation and lifespan of the carbon composite gear synchronizers.

These are the lubricants recommended by New Venture Gear for the NV4500:
 75W-90 Castrol Syntorque Synthetic
 Mopar Synthetic Manual Transmission Lubricant Mopar P/N 4874459 (Material Specification 9070) 
 GM Goodwrench® Synthetic Manual Transmission Fluid (GM Part No. U.S. 12346190 superseded by 19369226, in Canada 10953477)

Applications

GM Light truck
General Motors used the NV4500 as RPO MT8 & MW3 in 8500 + GVWR light trucks.
 1991-2000 GMC & Chevrolet C/K 2500 and 3500
 1999 & 2000 Chevrolet Silverado 2500 and 3500
 2001-2006 Chevrolet Silverado 2500HD and 3500 and 2007 Silverado Classic
 2001-2006 GMC Sierra 2500HD and 3500

1991-2007 RPO MT8 & MW3 Shared Features:
 GM corporate V8 bellhousing to engine bolt pattern
 GM specific input shaft measuring 6-5/8" in length, 1.125" in diameter with 10 splines and a .590" diameter pilot  
 All 2WD use a fixed yoke output
 All 4WD use a GM specific 32 spline output

1991-1994 RPO MT8 Features:
 GM NV4500 Transmission to bellhousing bolt pattern (not the same as GM 4-speeds)
 Right hand mounted hydraulic slave cylinder with fork mounted throw-out bearing
 1991-93 1st and Reverse not synchronized

MT8 Gear ratios:

1995–2007 RPO MW3 Features:
 Dodge Transmission to bellhousing bolt pattern 
 Concentric internal hydraulic clutch slave cylinder with integrated throw-out bearing
 
MW3 Gear ratios:

Dodge Ram
Chrysler Corporation Dodge Truck division used the NV4500 as NVG4500 in "Standard" and "Heavy Duty" applications.

Shared Standard Duty & Heavy Duty Features:
 Dodge NV4500 Transmission to bellhousing bolt pattern (shared with the 1995–2005 GM light trucks)
 Dodge specific input shaft 7.5" long with .725" diameter pilot  shaft diameter & spline count varies
 Concentric internal hydraulic clutch slave cylinder with integrated throw-out bearing
 1992.5-1997 2WD Gear drive speedometer in tail housing Some 1998 may have gear drive
 1998–UP 2WD no speedometer gear (VSS in axle)
 
Standard Duty 1992.5–2005 order code DDP:
All Years have Dodge small block bellhousing to engine bolt pattern
1992.5–2002 Used with 5.9 V8(5.2L v8 used NV3500)
2003–2005 5.7 hemi offered with 2500/3500 only
1992.5 only 1" diameter 19 Spline input shaft  
1993–UP 1.125" diameter 10 Spline input shaft 
1992.5–UP 2WD 30 spline output
1992.5-2000 4WD 23 spline output
2001–UP 4WD 29 spline output

Heavy Duty 1994–2005 order code DDX:
All Years used with 5.9 Cummins Turbo Diesel and 8.0 V-10 
All Years 5.9 Cummins Turbo Diesel & 8.0 V10 bellhousing to engine bolt pattern
All Years 1.25" diameter 10 Spline input shaft
All Years 2WD 31 spline output
All Years 4WD 29 spline output

Dodge Gear ratios:

References

New Venture transmissions
General Motors transmissions